Mourine Osoru (born 3 November 1989) is a Ugandan accountant and legislator who as of February 2022 serves as the elected woman representative for Arua City in Uganda's eleventh parliament. She held the same position in Uganda's tenth parliament Politically, she is affiliated to the affiliated to the National Resistance Movement under whose ticket she contested in the 2016 general election, achieving victory over Christine Bako Abia.

Background and education 
Osoru was born in Arua on 3 November 1989 to Sabua Ajio and Loyce Adiru. Osoru has a degree in Accounting and Finance obtained from the University of East London in 2014. Prior to that she attended Kisubi High School for her O Levels (2004–2008) and Forest Hill College, Mukono for her A Levels (2009–2010). Some sources list her as having attended primary school at St. Jude Nursery and Primary School while others show Kirinya Parents Primary School.

Career 
Prior to becoming a legislator in 2016, Osoru was an accountant in 2010 then Assistant Supervisor at Ajio Sabua Enterprises ( 2014–2015).

In Uganda's 10th Parliament, she is a member of the Committees on Human rights as well as Gender, Labour and Social Development.

In 2017, Osoru was elected President of the Forum of Young Parliamentarians of the Inter Parliamentary Union (IPU).

Osoru was kidnapped in 2016.

See also 
List of members of the tenth Parliament of Uganda

References

External links 
 Inter Parliamentary Union
 Parliament of Uganda

1989 births
Living people
National Resistance Movement politicians
Alumni of the University of East London
Members of the Parliament of Uganda
Women members of the Parliament of Uganda
21st-century Ugandan politicians
21st-century Ugandan women politicians